Łucja Matraszek-Chydzińska (born 4 May 1954) is a Polish gymnast. She competed at the 1972 Summer Olympics and the 1980 Summer Olympics.

References

1954 births
Living people
Polish female artistic gymnasts
Olympic gymnasts of Poland
Gymnasts at the 1972 Summer Olympics
Gymnasts at the 1980 Summer Olympics
Gymnasts from Warsaw